Abali (also Romanized as Ābʿalī) is a city in Rudehen District of Damavand County, Tehran province, Iran. At the 2006 census, its population was 2,607 in 727 households. The following census in 2011 counted 2,522 people in 766 households. The latest census in 2016 showed a population of 2,758 people in 875 households.

References 

Damavand County

Cities in Tehran Province

Populated places in Tehran Province

Populated places in Damavand County